Yang Li Lian (born 26 January 1993) is a Malaysian badminton player. In 2014, she competed at the Badminton at the 2014 Asian Games in Incheon, South Korea.

Career 
In 2010, she won a bronze medal at the Asian Junior Championships in the girls'doubles event partnered with Sonia Cheah Su Ya. In 2013, she competed at the Summer Universiade in Kazan, Russia. In 2014, she became the runner-up at the Iran Fajr International tournament in the women's singles event after defeated by her compatriot Tee Jing Yi. She also won the 2015 Bahrain International Series in the women's singles and mixed doubles event, and the 2017 Iceland International in the women's singles and doubles events. In January 2015, Li Lian announced her retirement from the Badminton Association of Malaysia in pursuit of her further education. Li Lian subsequently graduated from the University of Nottingham, United Kingdom with a first-class honours in Mathematics and Economics.

Achievements

Summer Universiade 
Women's singles

Asian Junior Championships 
Girls' doubles

BWF International Challenge/Series 
Women's singles

Women's doubles

Mixed doubles

  BWF International Challenge tournament
  BWF International Series tournament
  BWF Future Series tournament

References

External links 
 

1993 births
Living people
People from Selangor
Malaysian sportspeople of Chinese descent
Malaysian female badminton players
Badminton players at the 2014 Asian Games
Asian Games competitors for Malaysia
Competitors at the 2011 Southeast Asian Games
Competitors at the 2013 Southeast Asian Games
Southeast Asian Games bronze medalists for Malaysia
Southeast Asian Games medalists in badminton
Universiade bronze medalists for Malaysia
Universiade medalists in badminton
Medalists at the 2017 Summer Universiade
21st-century Malaysian women